Semau, also known as Pusmau and Pasar Pusmau, is an island in the Lesser Sunda Islands in Indonesia.  It is located 20 miles off the harbor of Kupang.  The inhabitants of Samau are the Helong people, who some believe are the original inhabitants of the Kupang area.   It is a supplier of firewood and charcoal and grows corn, watermelon, and mango.  Semau is also used as a holiday village where snorkeling, swimming, and other water sports are popular.

References

Outer Banda Arc